Robert W. "R.W." Julian (born December 8, 1938) is an American numismatist, author, and researcher.

Education and Career
Julian was educated at Purdue University.

Julian began his writing career in 1960. He has written for numerous numismatic publications, including Numismatic News, COINage, and Coins. He has contributed over 1,300 individual articles on numismatics during his career.

During his career he has written several books, including: Medals of the United States Mint, The First Century, 1792-1892; From Rus to Revolution; Russian Coins Through A Thousand Years; Medals of the U.S. Assay Commission, 1860-1977; and Russian Silver Coinage, 1796-1917.

In 2021, Julian was named one of Coin World's Most Influential People in Numismatics (1960-2020).

Awards
Julian has won several awards for his writing career, including the Burnett Anderson Memorial Award in 2002, and was elected to the American Numismatic Association Hall of Fame in 1998.

References

1938 births
Living people
American numismatists
Purdue University alumni